This article contains information about the literary events and publications of 1676.

Events
March 2 – George Etherege's play The Man of Mode is given its first performance, in London.
May 22 – Samuel Pepys is elected Master of Trinity House.
December 11 – The first performance of William Wycherley's play The Plain Dealer is given in London.
December – The German mathematician and philosopher Gottfried Leibniz arrives in Hanover to take up a post as "councillor" and librarian to Johann Friedrich, Duke of Brunswick-Calenberg.

New books

Prose
Robert Barclay – Theses Theologiae
Roger Boyle, 1st Earl of Orrery – English-Adventures by a Person of Honor
Charles Cotton – Cotton's Angler (a continuation of Izaak Walton's The Compleat Angler)
Ann, Lady Fanshawe – Memoir (of her deceased courtier husband, Sir Richard Fanshawe, 1st Baronet)
Domingo Fernández Navarrete – Tratados historicos, politicos, ethicos, y religiosos de la monarchia de China (An Account of the Empire of China, Historical, Political, Moral, and Religious)
Gabriel de Foigny – La Terre Australe connue (The Southern Land, Known)
Thomas Tomkinson – Truth's Triumph. A book on Muggletonianism. 
Izaak Walton – The Compleat Angler, 5th edition

Drama
Roger Boyle, 1st Earl of Orrery (?) – Zoroastres
John Crowne –The Country Wit
Thomas Duffet – Beauty's Triumph (masque)
Thomas d'Urfey 
The Fool Turned Critic
Madam Fickle
George Etherege – The Man of Mode
Nathaniel Lee – Gloriana, or the Court of Augustus Caesar
Thomas Otway – Don Carlos, Prince of Spain
Edward Ravenscroft – The Wrangling Lovers
Thomas Rawlins – Tom Essence
Elkanah Settle
 Pastor Fido
The Conquest of China by the Tartars
Ibrahim, the Illustrious Bassa (adapted from a story by Madeleine de Scudéry)
Thomas Shadwell
The Libertine
The Virtuoso
William Wycherley – The Plain Dealer
Agustín Moreto
El lindo don DiegoNo puede ser...El parecido en la corteVerdadera III parte de comediasBirths
June 21 – Anthony Collins, English philosopher (died 1729)
July 4 – José de Cañizares, Spanish dramatist (died 1750)
October 8 – Benito Jerónimo Feijóo y Montenegro, Spanish scholar and monk (died 1764)Unknown dates''
Péter Apor, Hungarian historian writing in Latin (died 1752)
Samuel Bownas, English Quaker religious writer (died 1753)
William Gwavas, English lawyer and writer in the Cornish language (died 1741)

Deaths
March 22 – Lady Anne Clifford, English patron and correspondent (born 1590)
July 25 – François Hédelin, abbé d'Aubignac, French writer and cleric (born 1604)
August 17 – Hans Jakob Christoffel von Grimmelshausen, German writer (born 1621)
September 2 – Edward Worsley, English religious writer (born 1605)
October 25 – Justus Georg Schottel, German grammarian (born 1612)
November 1 – Gisbertus Voetius, Dutch theologian (born 1589)
December 18 – Edward Benlowes, English poet (born 1603)
December 25 – William Cavendish, 1st Duke of Newcastle, English polymath (born 1592)

References

 
Years of the 17th century in literature